Providence Christian Academy (PCA) is a private, classical Christian school in Murfreesboro, Tennessee. The school opened in 1997 and has dual accreditation through both the Association of Christian Schools International and the Southern Association of Colleges and Schools/Council on Accreditation and School Improvement (SACS/CASI).

References

External links
Providence Christian Academy
Artsonia School » Providence Christian Academy

Christian schools in Tennessee
Classical Christian schools
Educational institutions established in 1997
Nondenominational Christian schools in the United States
Schools in Rutherford County, Tennessee
Buildings and structures in Murfreesboro, Tennessee
Private K-12 schools in Tennessee
1997 establishments in Tennessee